Brønnøy Church is a parish church of the Church of Norway in Brønnøy Municipality in Nordland county, Norway.  It is located in the town of Brønnøysund.  It is the main church for the Brønnøy parish which is part of the Sør-Helgeland prosti (deanery) in the Diocese of Sør-Hålogaland.  The brown, cruciform, stone church was built in a Neo-Gothic style in 1870 by the architect Haakon Mosling.  The church seats about 450 people.

History
The earliest existing historical records of the church date back to the year 1386, but the church was likely built around the year 1200 (end of the 12th century or early 13th century). There have been two church fires after lightning strikes on this site, the first in 1772 and the second in 1866. The original church had a rectangular nave with a narrower, almost square choir with a lower roof line. After the fire in 1772 the walls were repaired and an extension built to the north. Around 1800, the church received an extension to the south. After the second lightning strike in 1866, the church was heavily damaged by fire. It was decided to completely tear down the church and build a new church. In 1870, the present stone church building was built in a cross-shape, creating a cruciform layout. The organ was built by Claus Jensen (1817-1892) in 1879. It was restored by Br. Torkildsen Orgelbyggeri during 2006-2008 at which time the entire church underwent an extensive renovation.

Gallery

See also
List of churches in Sør-Hålogaland

References

Brønnøy
Churches in Nordland
Stone churches in Norway
Cruciform churches in Norway
19th-century Church of Norway church buildings
Churches completed in 1870
13th-century establishments in Norway
Millennium sites